Langhorne Manor is a borough in Bucks County, Pennsylvania. The population was 1,422 at the 2010 census, a 55.6% increase from the 2000 census. The mayor of Langhorne Manor is Bob Byrne.

History
Langhorne Manor was named for Jeremiah Langhorne.

The Langhorne Manor School was listed on the National Register of Historic Places in 2008.

Geography
Langhorne Manor is located at  (40.165859, -74.917795).

Demographics

As of the 2010 census, the borough was 89.9% Non-Hispanic White, 4.1% Black or African American, 0.2% Native American, 1.5% Asian, and 1.7% were two or more races. 3.3% of the population were of Hispanic or Latino ancestry.

As of the census of 2000, there were 927 people, 330 households, and 258 families residing in the borough. The population density was 1,559.7 people per square mile (606.6/km2). There were 336 housing units at an average density of 565.3 per square mile (219.9/km2). The racial makeup of the borough was 94.28% White, 3.24% African American, 0.11% Native American, 1.40% Asian, 0.43% from other races, and 0.54% from two or more races. Hispanic or Latino of any race were 1.08% of the population.

There were 330 households, out of which 31.8% had children under the age of 18 living with them, 65.2% were married couples living together, 10.6% had a female householder with no husband present, and 21.8% were non-families. 14.8% of all households were made up of individuals, and 5.2% had someone living alone who was 65 years of age or older. The average household size was 2.81 and the average family size was 3.14.

In the borough the population was spread out, with 23.6% under the age of 18, 7.1% from 18 to 24, 30.6% from 25 to 44, 25.5% from 45 to 64, and 13.2% who were 65 years of age or older. The median age was 39 years. For every 100 females there were 94.7 males. For every 100 females age 18 and over, there were 93.4 males.

The median income for a household in the borough was $67,500, and the median income for a family was $77,721. Males had a median income of $45,833 versus $35,781 for females. The per capita income for the borough was $27,302. About 1.6% of families and 2.7% of the population were below the poverty line, including 2.3% of those under age 18 and none of those age 65 or over.

Education
Langhorne Manor Borough is one of six municipalities served by the Neshaminy School District. Students residing in Langhorne Manor Borough attend: Tawanka Elementary School for Kindergarten through 4th grades, Maple Point Middle School for 5th through 8th grades, and Neshaminy High School for 9th through 12th grades.

During the past three years, two Langhorne area middle schools, Neshaminy Middle School which has recently closed and Maple Point Middle School, have been awarded the Blue Ribbon, National Schools of Excellence Award. Oliver Heckman Elementary School in Middletown Township closed in 2016 in favor of the new Tawanka Elementary School in Lower Southampton Township.

High school students can also attend Bucks County Technical High School, a career oriented vocational school, located in Fairless Hills.

Cairn University (formerly known as Philadelphia Biblical University) is partially located in Langhorne Manor Borough and partially in Middletown Township.

Transportation

U.S. Route 1 is the primary highway traversing Langhorne Manor, following a southwest–northeast alignment across the northwestern portion of the borough. Pennsylvania Route 413 also crosses the borough, following a northwest–southeast alignment via Bellevue Avenue.

The Langhorne station serving SEPTA Regional Rail's West Trenton Line is in the borough. SEPTA provides bus service to Langhorne Manor along City Bus Route 14, which runs between the Frankford Transportation Center in Northeast Philadelphia and the Oxford Valley Mall, and Suburban Bus Route 130, which runs between Frankford Avenue and Knights Road in Northeast Philadelphia and Bucks County Community College in Newtown.

Climate

According to the Köppen climate classification system, Langhorne Manor has a Hot-summer, Humid continental climate (Dfa). Dfa climates are characterized by at least one month having an average mean temperature ≤ , at least four months with an average mean temperature ≥ , at least one month with an average mean temperature ≥  and no significant precipitation difference between seasons. Although most summer days are slightly humid in Langhorne Manor, episodes of heat and high humidity can occur, with heat index values > . The average wettest month is July, which corresponds with the annual peak in thunderstorm activity. Episodes of extreme cold and wind can occur, with wind chill values < . Ice storms and large snowstorms depositing ≥  of snow occur once every few years, particularly during nor’easters from December through February.

Ecology

According to the A. W. Kuchler U.S. potential natural vegetation types, Langhorne Manor would have a dominant vegetation type of Appalachian Oak (104) with a dominant vegetation form of Eastern Hardwood Forest (25). The spring bloom typically begins by April 8 and fall color usually peaks by November 3.

References

External links

Populated places established in 1890
Boroughs in Bucks County, Pennsylvania